Bathycrinicola talaena is a species of sea snail, a marine gastropod mollusc in the family Eulimidae.

Distribution
This marine species occurs in the following locations:

 European waters (ERMS scope)
 United Kingdom Exclusive Economic Zone

References

External links
  Serge GOFAS, Ángel A. LUQUE, Joan Daniel OLIVER,José TEMPLADO & Alberto SERRA (2021) - The Mollusca of Galicia Bank (NE Atlantic Ocean); European Journal of Taxonomy 785: 1–114
 To World Register of Marine Species

Eulimidae
Gastropods described in 1897